Portland Farmers Market is a nonprofit organization operating five farmers markets in Portland, Oregon, United States. The markets provide a direct connection to more than 200 vendors with deep roots in Oregon and Southwest Washington, including farms, nurseries, bakeries, meat and seafood providers, cheese makers and specialty food producers. The flagship market at Portland State University was named the best farmers market in the United States for its size, varied offerings, live entertainment, and more, by Bravo TV. The same market was ranked #2 in the country for its number of vendors, amount of local, seasonal produce, year-round live music, the market managers' consideration of every detail, and making the most of what the region has to offer by supporting local farmers, by The Daily Meal.

The organization's mission is to operate world-class farmers markets that contribute to the success of local food growers and producers, and create vibrant community gatherings. The organization's vision and values include access to farm fresh food for all residents, sustainability, and organizational integrity.

During peak season, the markets serve up to 30,000 shoppers each week. Market programming was put on hold due to COVID in 2020 - it included Kids Cook at the Market, where kids learn about the seasonality of food, meet local farmers, and prepare ingredients purchased fresh at the market, and Chef in the Market, where Portland’s top chefs and Portland Farmers Market vendors celebrate height-of-the-season market ingredients as they educate and inspire home cooks with cooking demonstrations. The organization plans to bring back market programming in the near future.

Portland Farmers Market was established in 1992 and held its first market in the parking lot of Alber's Mill along the Willamette River that year. This allowed Portlanders, who once had to settle for markets in the suburbs or traveling to the farms themselves, easier access to farm fresh produce. 

Portland Farmers Market is celebrating its 30th anniversary in 2022.

Locations
Portland Farmers Market operates five markets throughout the city. Locations include three downtown markets, at Portland State University on Saturdays and Shemanski Park on Wednesdays. The three neighborhood markets are King and Lents International, both on Sundays, and Kenton on Wednesdays. The administrative office is located at 240 N Broadway, Suite 129.

See also
Portland Saturday Market
Portland Public Market
Salem Saturday Market

References

External links
Portland Farmers Market (official website)

Economy of Portland, Oregon
Portland, Oregon
Agriculture in Oregon
Tourist attractions in Portland, Oregon
1992 establishments in Oregon